The Dubai Open Squash is a men's squash tournament held in Dubai, United Arab Emirates in March. It is part of the PSA World Tour. The event was founded in 2014.

Past Results

References

External links
- Official website
- PSA Dubai Open 2015

Squash tournaments
Sports competitions in Dubai